USS Dekanawida may refer to the following ships operated by the United States Navy:

, ex U.S. Army Mine Planter Colonel George Armistead, ex commercial tugboat Mary Foss, was a Navy tug (1942–1946) during World War II.
 is a  currently serving Naval Station Guantanamo Bay, Cuba.

United States Navy ship names